Sonny Leong, Baron Leong,  (born September 1953) is a British Labour Party politician.

Career 
Leong co-founded Cavendish Publishing in 1990. The company made £250,000 in its first year.

In 2001, he was appointed managing director of Cavendish Publishing, with a 30-percent stake in the company. By 2003, it was the largest independent law publisher in the United Kingdom.

In 2006, Leong sold Cavendish Publishing to Taylor & Francis. He left Taylor & Francis in 2007 to join One Charter, a private jet business, as a non-executive director.

Formerly the Chair of Chinese for Labour, in October 2022, it was announced that he would receive a life peerage in the 2022 Special Honours. On 31 October 2022, he was created Baron Leong, of Chilton in the County of Oxfordshire and of Camden Town in the London Borough of Camden.

Personal life
Leong and his wife, Gita, have a daughter, Sonya. He was appointed a Commander of the Order of the British Empire (CBE) in the 2014 Birthday Honours for political service.

References

Living people
Life peers created by Charles III
British politicians of Chinese descent
Labour Party (UK) life peers
Commanders of the Order of the British Empire
English barristers
1953 births